The 2005 UCI Women's Road World Cup was the eighth edition of the UCI Women's Road World Cup. It was contested over eleven rounds; in addition to the races in 2004, there was the return of the New Zealand World Cup and the GP of Wales. Oenone Wood won her second consecutive overall title.

Races

Final classification

External links

 
2005 in women's road cycling
UCI Women's Road World Cup